is a Japanese manga series written by Yui Hara. The manga began serialization in Mag Garden's Comic Blade magazine in January 2006 and ended serialization in April 2007. Three tankōbon volumes of the manga were released between September 9, 2006 and July 10, 2007. The manga was licensed in North America by Tokyopop and the first volume was released on September 7, 2010.

Reception
Reviewing the first volume, critics gave the manga lackluster reviews comparing it to a standard fantasy story of a boy traveling to a different world, but found specific aspects to show potential. ComicBookBin called the story cute saying that it is differentiated from other stories by the "interesting dynamic between Kazuki and Marie" and  "Kazuki's unending optimism",  but is otherwise average. Comics Worth Reading said that there wasn't much to say about the first volume since it is mostly setup, but called it "one of those books with lots of potential", adding that "[t]his volume is like cotton candy, a pleasant but substanceless treat." ICv2 said that points of interest in the manga were "a surlier than usual heroine in Marie [and] a remarkably passive 'hero' in Kazuki", adding that the story concept was ubiquitous, but the manga is "done professionally enough this shouldn't bother the genre's many fans." Sequential Tart called the manga a "cute little story that will captivate readers younger than the recommended 13+", calling Kazuki an average character, but noting that Marie is a great character "hiding something dark", concluding that the manga was fun to read but doesn't offer anything unique to want readers to read more. Manga Life called the manga "a little too... typical" in terms of the storyline and characters, but felt that there was potential in the series if the author went "a little deeper in the next volume".

References

External links

2006 manga
Shōnen manga
Mag Garden manga
Tokyopop titles
Fantasy anime and manga
Comics about magic